Ammon Matuauto (born 29 January 1986) is a New Zealand rugby union footballer who currently plays as a centre for the Western Force in the international Super Rugby competition.   Domestically he represents  in the Australian National Rugby Championship.   He has previously played professionally in his homeland for South Island Māori in 2008 and the  Makos in 2009.

Super Rugby statistics

References

1986 births
Living people
New Zealand rugby union players
Rugby union centres
Western Force players
Perth Spirit players
Tasman rugby union players
Rugby union players from Wellington City